|}

The Falmouth Stakes is a Group 1 flat horse race in Great Britain open to fillies and mares aged three years or older. It is run on the July Course at Newmarket over a distance of 1 mile (1,609 metres), and it is scheduled to take place each year in July.

History
The event is named in honour of Evelyn Boscawen, 6th Viscount Falmouth, who was a leading racehorse owner and breeder in the 19th century. It was established in 1911, and it was originally restricted to three-year-old fillies.

The present system of race grading was introduced in 1971, and the Falmouth Stakes was initially classed at Group 3 level. It was opened to older fillies and mares in 1974. It became known as the Child Stakes in 1975, when Child's Bank began a period of sponsorship. It was promoted to Group 2 level in 1987, and it reverted to its original name in 1992. It was raised to Group 1 status in 2004.

The Falmouth Stakes is currently held on the second day of Newmarket's three-day July Festival meeting.

Records
Most successful horse (2 wins):
 Sonic Lady – 1986, 1987
 Soviet Song – 2004, 2005

Leading jockey (7 wins):
 Lester Piggott – Sylphide (1957), Green Opal (1960), Chrona (1966), Vital Match (1969), Chalon (1982), Niche (1993), Lemon Souffle (1994)

Leading trainer (6 wins):
 Alec Taylor, Jr. – First Spear (1914), Tomatina (1919), Lady Ava (1920), Blue Lady (1921), Leighon Tor (1922), Maid of Bath (1924)
 Sir Michael Stoute - Royal Heroine (1983), Sonic Lady (1986 & 1987), Lovers Knot (1998), Integral (2014), Veracious (2019)

Leading owner (4 wins):
 Waldorf Astor, 2nd Viscount Astor – First Spear (1914), Point Duty (1929), Pennycross (1932), Wheedler (1946)

Winners since 1979

Earlier winners

 1911: Alice
 1912: Saucy Vixen
 1913: Queen's Parade
 1914: First Spear
 1915: Silver Tag
 1916: Eos
 1917: no race
 1918: Herself
 1919: Tomatina
 1920: Lady Ava
 1921: Blue Lady
 1922: Leighon Tor
 1923: Shrove
 1924: Maid of Bath
 1925: Bar Sinister
 1926: Glasheen
 1927: Hunt the Slipper
 1928: Mara
 1929: Point Duty
 1930: Theresina
 1931: Pisa
 1932: Pennycross
 1933: Eclair
 1934: Mis Tor
 1935: Coppelia
 1936: Crested Crane
 1937: Tumbrel
 1938: La-Li
 1939: Bountiful
 1940: no race
 1941: Commotion
 1942–44: no race
 1945: Sweet Cygnet
 1946: Wheedler
 1947: Mermaid
 1948: Goblet
 1949: Suntime
 1950: Val d'Assa
 1951: Red Shoes
 1952: Queen of Light
 1953: Happy Laughter
 1954: Sundry
 1955: Gloria Nicky
 1956: Following Breeze
 1957: Sylphide
 1958: Court One
 1959: Crystal Palace
 1960: Green Opal
 1961: Aphrodita
 1962: Tournella
 1963: Crevette
 1964: Alborada
 1965: Pugnacity
 1966: Chrona
 1967: Resilience II
 1968: Ileana
 1969: Vital Match
 1970: Caprera
 1971: Favoletta
 1972: Waterloo
 1973: Jacinth
 1974: Himawari
 1975: Sauceboat
 1976: Duboff
 1977: River Dane
 1978: Cistus

See also
 Horse racing in Great Britain
 List of British flat horse races

References
 Paris-Turf:
 Racing Post:
 galopp-sieger.de – Falmouth Stakes.
 horseracingintfed.com – International Federation of Horseracing Authorities – Falmouth Stakes (2019).
 pedigreequery.com – Falmouth Stakes – Newmarket.
 

Flat races in Great Britain
Newmarket Racecourse
Mile category horse races for fillies and mares
Recurring sporting events established in 1911
British Champions Series
Boscawen family
1911 establishments in England